I Spy is a children's book series with text written by Jean Marzollo, photographs by Walter Wick, and published by Scholastic Press. Each page contains a photo with objects in it, and the riddles (written in dactylic tetrameter rhyme) accompanying the photo state which objects have to be found.

Although the first I Spy book contains unrelated pages of still life pictures, subsequent books are more thematic.

Several video games based on the I Spy books are available for Windows PC, Nintendo DS, Wii, iOS, Leapster, and Game Boy Advance, including I Spy Spooky Mansion, I Spy Treasure Hunt, and I Spy Fantasy. These served as early examples of an increasingly popular hidden object game genre.

I Spy merchandise has been sold in at least 31 countries worldwide.

Wick stated in a 1997 news article, "My career can really be put into two categories: before I Spy and after I Spy. ... The success of the books has been really nice. I never got that lucky break in my commercial career, but all of that hard work ... was usable for I Spy."

Authors 
Jean Marzollo is the award-winning author of over 100 books, including Help Me Learn Numbers 0-20, Help Me Learn Addition, Help Me Learn Subtraction, Pierre the Penguin, Soccer Sam, Happy Birthday Martin Luther King, The Little Plant Doctor, In 1776, Mama Mama/Papa Papa, and I Am Water, as well as books for parents and teachers such as The New Kindergarten.

Walter Wick is the author and photographer of the best-selling series Can You See What I See?.

Carol Carson Devine, the book designer for the first I Spy books, is art director at Alfred A. Knopf Publishers. She has designed covers for books by John Updike, Joan Didion, Alice Munro, Bill Clinton and Pope John Paul II.

Book list

For all ages

Classics
I Spy: A Book of Picture Riddles (1992) 
I Spy Christmas (1992)
I Spy Fun House (1993) 
I Spy Mystery (1993)
I Spy Fantasy (1994) 
I Spy School Days (1995) 
I Spy Spooky Night (1996) 
I Spy Treasure Hunt (1999)

Challengers
I Spy Super Challenger! (1997)
I Spy Gold Challenger! (1998)
I Spy Extreme Challenger! (2000)
I Spy Year-Round Challenger! (2001)
I Spy Ultimate Challenger! (2003)
I Spy Super Extreme Challenger! (2009)

For beginning readers

Paperback readers
I Spy Funny Teeth (2003)
I Spy a Dinosaur's Eye (2003)
I Spy a School Bus (2003)
I Spy a Scary Monster (2004)
I Spy a Candy Cane (2004)
I Spy Lightning in the Sky (2005)
I Spy a Pumpkin (2005)
I Spy a Penguin (2005)
I Spy Santa Claus (2005)
I Spy a Balloon (2006)
I Spy a Butterfly (2007)
I Spy Merry Christmas (2007)
I Spy I Love You (2009)
I Spy a Skeleton (2010)
I Spy an Egg in a Nest (2011)
I Spy an Apple (2011)
I Spy Thanksgiving (2011)
I Spy School (2012)

Phonics and more
I Spy Phonics Fun Boxset (2007)
I Spy A to Z (2009)

For babies and preschoolers

Board books
I Spy Little Book (2002)
I Spy Little Animals (2002)
I Spy Little Wheels (2003)
I Spy Little Numbers (2003)
I Spy Little Christmas (2003)
I Spy Little Letters (2004)
I Spy Little Bunnies (2004)
I Spy Little Hearts (2004)
I Spy Little Learning Box (2004)
I Spy Little Toys (2005)

Square paperbacks
I Spy Letters (2006)
I Spy Numbers (2006)
I Spy Animals (2006)
I Spy a Funny Frog (2007)
I Spy Hearts (2007)
I Spy Bunnies (2008)

Other books

Sticker books
I Spy Sticker Book & Picture Riddles (2012)

Novelty books
I Spy a Christmas Tree (2012)

Special books
I Spy Spectacular (2011)

Game adaptations

PC and Mac
I Spy (1997)
I Spy Junior (1999)
I Spy Spooky Mansion (1999)
I Spy School Days (2000)
I Spy Junior Puppet Playhouse (2000)
I Spy Treasure Hunt (2001)
I Spy Fantasy (2003)
I Spy Spooky Mansion Deluxe (2004)
I Spy Mystery (2006)
I Spy Fun House (2008)
I Spy Challenger (2014)
I Spy Pirate Ship (2015)

Nintendo DS
I Spy Fun House (2007)
I Spy Universe (2010)
I Spy Castle (2011)
I Spy Game Pack (compilation of I Spy Universe and I Spy Fun House, 2012)

Wii
Ultimate I Spy (2008)
I Spy Spooky Mansion (2010)
I Spy Game Pack (compilation of Ultimate I Spy and I Spy Spooky Mansion, 2012)

iPhone apps
I Spy Riddle Race (2009)
I Spy Spooky Mansion (2009)
I Spy Arcade: Critter Craze (2013)
I Spy Arcade: Fine Line (2013)
I Spy Arcade: Match Attack (2013)
I Spy Arcade: Spy Squares (2013)

Leapster
I Spy Challenger (2011)
I Spy Super Challenger (2012)
I Spy Treasure Hunt (2012)
I Spy Spooky Mansion (2012)

Game Boy Advance
I Spy Challenger (2002)

DVD games
I Spy Treasure Hunt (2012)
I Spy Spooky Mansion (2012)
I Spy Fantasy (2012)
I Spy (2014)

Flash
I Spy Bingo (2009)
I Spy Puzzler (2009)
I Spy Mystery Match (2009)
I Spy The Library (2010)
I Spy City (2010)
I Spy The View from Duck Pond Inn (2013)
I Spy Rhyme Time (2013)
I Spy Riddle Round-Up (2013)
I Spy Catch 'em if you Can (2013)
I Spy Make a Picture Online (2014)
I Spy Write a Riddle Online (2014)

Tag
I Spy Imagine That! (2010)

Awards
The I Spy series has won numerous awards :

Books
I Spy: A Book of Picture Riddles (HC)
California Children's Media Award, Honorable Mention
NYPL 100 Titles for Reading and Sharing
"Definitely fun, and educational, too; this is a true eye-opener." —Los Angeles Times
I Spy Christmas (HC)
Parents' Magazine Best Book
"Features gorgeously styled, full-spread color photos of many objects." —Publishers Weekly, starred review
I Spy Fun House (HC)
Publishers Weekly Best Book of the Year
"Sumptuously styled.... A lot of mirror mazes and magic tricks." —Publishers Weekly
I Spy Mystery (HC)
Publishers Weekly Best Book of the Year, National Parenting Publication Award Honorable Mention
I Spy Spooky Night
American Bookseller Pick of the Lists
"A must, in multiple copies, for any Halloween collection." —School Library Journal, starred review,
"Spectacularly eerie pictures chock full of hidden objects." —Booklist
I Spy Treasure Hunt
2001 Parent's Choice Award
"Intricate and ingenious." —Booklist
"Marzollo's structured rhymes provide the clues while Wick's stunningly detailed miniature village provides the hidden answers for readers to seek out." —School Library Journal
I Spy Phonics Fun Boxset
2008 Oppenheim Toy Portfolio Platinum Award Winner

Interactive adaptation
I Spy Treasure Hunt (CD-ROM)
2001 Parents’ Choice Software Recommended Award
Best Selling PC Games PlayDate 2001
2001 Parent's Guide to Children's Media Award
The National Parenting Center's Seal of Approval
Choosing Children's Software Best Picks Award
The #1 Best-Selling Educational Title October 2001, NPD Intelect
Kids First! Endorsement
2001/2002 BESSIE (Best Educational Software) Award
2002 Distinguished Achievement Award Finalist, Association of Educational Publishers
2002 Parenting Magazine's Software of the Year Award
I Spy Fantasy (CD-ROM)
Top Choice Software Award, Museum of Science Boston
All Star Software, Children's Software & New Media Revue - 4.9 Rating
The National Parenting Center Seal of Approval
Child Magazine Best Software & Video Games of 2003
Parent & Child Teacher's Pick Best Tech 2003
Best Educational Software, Review Corner
2004 BESSIE (Best Educational Software) Award
2004 Parents’ Choice Gold Award
2004 Distinguished Achievement Award "Best Graphics", Association of Educational Publishers
I Spy Spooky Mansion Deluxe (CD-ROM)
National Parenting Publications Awards (NAPPA) Gold Award Winner 2004
All Star Software, Children's Software & New Media Revue - 5.0 Rating
2004 Parents’ Choice Recommended Award
2004 Top Choice Software Award, Museum of Science Boston
I Spy Mystery (CD-ROM)
Dr. Toy's 100 Best Children's Products for 2006
Dr. Toy's 10 Best Software//CD-ROM/High-Tech Products for 2006
Best Interactive Games of 2006, Child Magazine
Best of 2006 Technology, Parent & Child Magazine
2006 Best Video Games for Kids, Best PC Puzzler – Nick Jr. Magazine
Editor's Choice, Children's Technology Revue
I Spy Fun House (CD-ROM)
National Parenting Center Seal of Approval
I Spy Treasure Hunt (Leapster)
National Parenting Center Seal of Approval
Parents’ Choice Silver Award
I Spy Fun House (Nintendo DS)
The National Parenting Center's 2008 Seal of Approval
Kids First! Endorsement
Parents’ Choice Recommended
Ultimate I Spy (Wii)
iParenting Media Award
Parents' Choice Gold Award

TV adaptation
I Spy TV Series
2004 USA Film Festival – Finalist
Telly Awards – Finalist
Parent's Choice Award – Silver Honor Award
Chicago International Television Award – Certificate of Merit
2003 Chicago International Children's Film Festival – Certificate of Merit
Chicago International Television Award – Certificate of Merit – Program
Chicago International Television Award – Certificate of Merit – Series
Daytime Emmy Award – Winner – Individual Animation (Pete Sluszka)
International Film & Video Festival – Screening & 3rd Place certificate
Literacy in Media Awards – Finalist
Parent's Choice Award – Silver Medal
Shenandoah University Parent's Guide – Recommended
USA Film Festival – Finalist

Game and puzzle adaptations
I Spy Preschool Game
1998 Canadian Toy Testing Council Three Stars
Oppenheim Toy Portfolio Gold Seal Award
Parents Choice Approved
2002 PlayDate Top-Selling Board Game
I Spy Flip 5
2009 Oppenheim Toy Portfolio Gold Seal Award
Oppenheim Toy Portfolio Platinum Award
I Spy Ready, Set, Silhouette
2009 Oppenheim Toy Portfolio Gold Seal Award
I Spy Bingo Game
2003 Oppenheim Toy Portfolio Gold Seal Award
Canadian Toy Testing Council Three Stars
Creative Child Magazine "Preferred Choice"
I Spy Memory Game
1995 Dr. Toy's 100 Best Children's Products
Duracell Kids Choice National Toy Award
Learning Magazine Teacher's Choice Award
National Parenting Publication, Honors Award
Oppenheim Toy Portfolio Platinum Seal Award
Parenting Magazine Best Toys of the Year
Parents Choice Gold Seal of Excellence
Parents Magazine Best Toys & Games
Working Mother Magazine
The Right Toys for the Right Age
1997 Specialty Retailer Top Toys
2004 Dr. Toy's Best Classic Products
I Spy Travel Game
2003 Dr. Toy's 100 Best Vacation Products
2002 Parents Choice Gold Seal of Excellence
I Spy 3D
2008 Oppenheim Toy Portfolio Platinum Seal Award
2007 Dr. Toy's Best Vacation Products
iParenting Media Award
sCanadian Toy Council 2 Stars
I Spy Eagle Eye Game
2006, Dr. Toy's 10 Best Games
Dr. Toy's 100 Best Children's Products
National Parenting Center Seal of Approval
National Parenting Publications
Honors, Creative Child Magazine "Preferred Choice"
iParenting Media Award
Canadian Toy Testing Council Three stars
2007 Learning Express Best Game
I Spy Private Eye
2008 National Parenting Seal of Approval Award
Creative Child Preferred Choice Award
Dr. Toy's 100 Best Children's Products
Dr. Toy's Top 10 Games
NAPPA Award Winners
I Spy Spooky Night
2004 Canadian Toy Testing Council Award Three Stars
Creative Child Magazine Preferred Choice
Educational Games
Dr. Toy's Best Smart Play/Smart Toy Products
Dr. Toy's 100 Best Children's Products
iParenting Media Award
Nick Jr. Family Magazine Top 50
I Spy Monster Workshop Puzzle (63 Pc)
1998 Working Mother Magazine
The Right Toys for the Right Age
I Spy 1,2,3 Floor Puzzle
1998 Oppenheim Toy Portfolio Gold Seal Award
I Spy Go Fish Card Game
1999 Canadian Toy Testing Council Award Three Stars
Crayola Kids Magazine "The Years Best Toys"
Women's Day "Top Toys Under $10"
I Spy Snap Card Game
1999 Canadian Toy Testing Council Award Three Stars
Crayola Kids Magazine's "The Years Best Toys"
2000 Southeastern Wisconsin "Big Cheese" Toy Test

External links
Jean Marzollo Website I Spy Page
 Walter Wick Website I SPY Page
Scholastic I SPY Page

References

Series of children's books